Scimitar, Simitar or Symitar may refer to: 

 Scimitar, a backsword or sabre with a curved blade, originating in the Middle East
 Simitar Entertainment, a former entertainment company, founded 1980, bankrupt and defunct in 2000
 Symitar, a business unit of Jack Henry & Associates